Julmust ( "yule" and  English: 'must' "not-yet-fermented juice of fruit or berries", though there is no such juice in julmust) is a soft drink that is mainly consumed in Sweden around Christmas. During the rest of the year, it is sometimes sold under the name must. The content is the same regardless of the marketing name, although the length of time it is stored before bottling differs; however, the beverage is more closely associated with Christmas, somewhat less with Easter and traditionally not at all with the summer. 45 million litres of julmust are consumed during December, which is around 50% of the total soft drink volume in December and 75% of the total yearly must sales. Must was created by Harry Roberts and his father Robert Roberts in 1910 as a non-alcoholic alternative to beer.

Ingredients  

The syrup is still made exclusively by Roberts in Örebro. The syrup is sold to different soft drink manufacturers that then make the final product in their own way. This means that the must from two different companies doesn't taste the same, even though they are made of the same syrup.

Must is made of carbonated water, sugar, hop extract, malt extract, spices, caramel colouring, citric acid, and preservatives. The hops and malt extracts give the must a somewhat root beer-like taste without the sassafras - or British/Caribbean malt drinks such as Supermalt. It can be aged provided it is stored in a glass bottle. Some people buy julmust in December only to store it a year before drinking it. In 2013, a rumour occurred that the EU would ban julmust due to a directive banning the selling of malt beverages containing caramel colouring. The rumour however turned out to be false since julmust is not a fermented beverage and hence not affected by the directive.

Julmust and Coca-Cola 
In Sweden, julmust outsells Coca-Cola during the Christmas season; in fact, the consumption of Coca-Cola drops by as much as 50% over the holiday. This was quoted as one of the main reasons that The Coca-Cola Company broke away from their contract with the local brewer Pripps and started Coca-Cola Drycker Sverige AB instead. Coca-Cola Drycker Sverige AB produced its own julmust, albeit very slyly with The Coca-Cola Company's name occupying only a small space on the label. Their julmust was never advertised until 2004, when Coca-Cola started marketing their julmust under the brand "Bjäre julmust", but they bought the syrup from Roberts AB. By 2007, the "Bjäre julmust" was only sold at McDonald's restaurants and it had completely disappeared from Coca-Colas range of products by Christmas 2008, only to return for Christmas 2011.

Outside Sweden 
 In November 2004, PepsiCo marketed a product somewhat similar in taste to julmust in the United States called Pepsi Holiday Spice. It was on sale during the 2004 and 2006 Christmas seasons.
 Cost Plus World Market in the United States sells julmust during the Christmas holiday season.
 IKEA sells Dryck Julmust in several countries during Christmas, which is a Julmust variant with sweetener instead of sugar. As of 2017, it is called "Vintersaga" (winter saga) Swedish festive drink. Similar to Julmust, it is also sold in some countries as Dryck Påskmust at Easter.
 Julmust can be found at speciality shops in the United Kingdom (also through Sainsbury's and Ocado)  and Belgium.
 Julmust is also available for purchase in Finland around Christmas. It is considered part of the Christmas dinner by the Swedish-speaking minority. It has also found popularity within the rest of the population as well.

See also 
Malt drink
Kvass
Dandelion and burdock
List of soft drinks by country
Svagdricka

References 

Christmas food
Soft drinks
Swedish drinks
Soft beers and malt drinks
Non-alcoholic drinks
Swedish words and phrases